Jesús Ángel Fernández (born 7 June 1962) is a Spanish handball player. He competed in the men's tournament at the 1988 Summer Olympics.

References

1962 births
Living people
Spanish male handball players
Olympic handball players of Spain
Handball players at the 1988 Summer Olympics
Place of birth missing (living people)